Arsenicitalea aurantiaca is an arsenic-resistan bacteria from the family of Devosiaceae which has been isolated from high-arsenic sediments from the Jianghan Plain in China.

References

External links
Type strain of Arsenicitalea aurantiaca at BacDive -  the Bacterial Diversity Metadatabase

Bacteria described in 2016